Michael George Moye (born August 11, 1954) is an American photographer and a former television writer and producer. In his television career he has written for shows such as The Jeffersons, Diff'rent Strokes, Good Times, and 227, and produced It's Your Move and The Jeffersons. His best-known work is likely the 1987 series Married... with Children, created with Ron Leavitt for the then-fledgling Fox network.

Early career
Moye began his career in 1977 with a staff writing position on Good Times. Between 1979 and 1984, he wrote for The Jeffersons, and in 1982 he co-developed Silver Spoons, which ran for five seasons. He also co-developed both It's Your Move and 227 (with Bill Boulware), the latter under alias C.J. Banks.

Married... with Children
Married... with Children, created by Moye and Leavitt in 1987 for the Fox network, was called an "anti-family" series  or "the anti-Cosby", Moye and Leavitt being fed up with the idealized family of the sitcoms of the 1980s.<ref>{{Cite web|url=https://ew.com/article/1994/11/25/married-childrens-legacy/|title=Married With Children'''s legacy|website=EW.com|language=EN|access-date=2020-03-11}}</ref> They created the couple Al-Peggy by imagining a fictional union between Roseanne Barr and Sam Kinison.

Moye was a producer and a writer on the show for most of its run, and had a hand in writing a series-leading 25 episodes as well as having a few cameo appearances on screen. The show ran for 11 seasons and was credited with keeping the fledgling Fox network "in the black for five or six years." The show has been the target of conservative political campaigns several times. In 1993, he refused to modify a two-episode show (the one where Al Bundy lobbies in Congress after his favorite show Psycho Dad was cancelled), accusing instead Fox to be too soft with censorship regulators.

Personal life
Moye retired from television in 1995 and is now a photographer and an avid coral reef aquarium hobbyist. He has two children from two marriages.

In 1992, Michael G. Moye acquired a 13,749-square-feet estate in Conyers Farm in Greenwich
 Connecticut, for $1.5 million. It was put up for sale for $8.595 million in November 2017. He also owned a house in Encino that he sold for $1.65 million in 2017, and bought a 2000-square-feet residence on sugar sand beaches in North Carolina in 2006.

FilmographyGood Times (1978)Diff'rent Strokes (1979)The Jeffersons (1979)Sanford (1980)Checking In (1981)Silver Spoons (1982)It's Your Move (1984) (co-creator, with Ron Leavitt)227 (1985-1990) (Credited as "C.J. Banks", co-creator, with Bill Boulware)Married... with Children'' (1987-1997) (Co-Creator, with Ron Leavitt)

References

External links
 
 

1954 births
African-American screenwriters
African-American television writers
American photographers
American television producers
American television writers
American male television writers
Artists from New Haven, Connecticut
Living people
Place of birth missing (living people)
Screenwriters from Connecticut
21st-century African-American people
20th-century African-American people
African-American male writers